The history of Florida International University, the first public institution of higher education in Miami and largest university in South Florida, began in 1965, with the introduction of a bill for the planning of the city's first state university. Florida International University was established in 1969 when it was established as a space-grant university by the Florida Legislature. Florida International is one of the youngest but the second largest university in the State University System of Florida. Florida International's opening in 1972, was the largest opening enrollment in U.S. collegiate history with 5,667 students enrolled.

Early Years
In 1943, state senator Ernest 'Cap' Graham (father of future Florida governor and U.S. senator Bob Graham) presented the state legislature with the initial proposal for the establishment of a public university in Miami-Dade County. While his bill did not pass, Graham persisted in presenting his proposal to colleagues, advising them of the county's need for a state university. He felt the establishment of a public university was necessary to serve the city's growing population.

In 1964, Senate Bill 711 was introduced by Florida senator Robert M. Haverfield. It instructed the state Board of Education and the Board of Regents (BOR) to begin planning for the development of the state university. The bill was signed into law by then-governor W. Haydon Burns in June 1965.

FIU's founding president Charles "Chuck" Perry was appointed by the Board of Regents in July 1969, at which time the institution was named Florida International University. At 32 years old, the new president was the youngest in the history of the State University System and, at the time, the youngest university president in the country. Perry recruited three co-founders, Butler Waugh, Donald McDowell and Nick Sileo. Alvah Chapman, Jr., former Miami Herald publisher and Knight Ridder chairman, used his civic standing and media power to assist the effort. In the 1980s, Chapman became chair of the FIU Foundation Board of Trustees.

The founders located the campus on the site of the original Tamiami Airport (not related to the later Kendall-Tamiami Airport) on the Tamiami Trail (U.S. Route 41) between Southwest 107th and 117th Avenues, just east of where the West Dade Expressway (now the Homestead Extension of Florida's Turnpike) was being planned. The abandoned airport's air traffic control tower became FIU's first building, with Perry's office on the first floor. It originally had no telephones, no drinking water, and no furniture. Perry decided that the tower should never be destroyed, and it remains on campus, where it is now known variously as the "Veterans Office," "Ivory Tower," the "Tower Building," or the "Public Safety Tower," and is the former location of the FIU Police Department.

Groundbreaking for the Tamiami campus was held in January 1971. U Thant received FIU's first honorary degree.

Miami-Dade County's public university

In September 1972, 5,667 students entered the new state university, the largest opening day enrollment at the time. Eighty percent of the student body had just graduated from Dade County Junior College (now Miami-Dade College). A typical student entering FIU was 25 years old and attending school full-time while holding down a full-time job. Forty-three percent were married. Negotiations with the University of Miami and Dade County Junior College led FIU to open as an upper-division only school; Perry's vision foresaw a "no gimmicks" institution with no student housing. It would be nine years before lower-division classes were added.

The first commencement, held in June 1973, took place in the reading room of the ground floor of Primera Casa – the only place large enough on campus for the ceremony. More than 1,500 family members and friends watched FIU's first class of 191 graduates receive their diplomas.

By late 1975, after seven years at the helm, Charles Perry felt he had accomplished his goal and left the university to become president and publisher of the Sunday newspaper magazine Family Weekly (later USA Weekend), one of the country's largest magazines. When he left, there were more than 10,000 students attending classes and a campus with five major buildings and a sixth being planned.

Crosby and Wolfe: 1976–1986

Harold Crosby, the university's second president and the founding president of the University of West Florida in Pensacola, agreed in 1976 to serve a three-year "interim" term. Under his leadership, FIU's North Miami Campus (which was officially renamed the Bay Vista Campus in 1980, the North Miami Campus in 1987, the North Campus in 1994, and the Biscayne Bay Campus in 2000)—located on the former Interama site on Biscayne Bay—was opened in 1977. State senator Jack Gordon was instrumental in securing funding for the development of the campus. President Crosby emphasized the university's international character, prompting the launching of new programs with an international focus and the recruitment of faculty from the Caribbean and Latin America. President Crosby's resignation in January 1979 triggered the search for a "permanent" president.

Gregory Baker Wolfe, a former United States diplomat and then-president of Portland State University, became FIU's third president, serving from 1979 to 1986. During his tenure, the institution continued to grow; it became a four-year institution, though Wolfe was criticized for not hiring enough minorities and for leading a weak private fundraising effort. After stepping down as president, Wolfe taught in the university's international relations department. The student union on the Biscayne Bay Campus is named in his honor.

Maidique presidency and expansion

Modesto A. Maidique assumed the presidency at FIU in 1986, becoming the fourth in the university's history and the first Hispanic leader of any of Florida's state universities. Maidique graduated with a Bachelor of Science, Master of Science, and PhD in Electrical Engineering from Massachusetts Institute of Technology (MIT), before joining the private sector. He held academic appointments from MIT, Harvard and Stanford Universities, and has been named to several US presidential boards and committees.

Under his leadership, FIU heralded in an era of unprecedented growth and prestige, with all facets of the university undergoing major transformations. Physically, the university tripled in size and its enrollment grew to nearly 40,000. During his 23 years as president, the school established the Herbert Wertheim College of Medicine, the FIU College of Law, the FIU School of Architecture, and the Robert Stempel School of Public Health. Also during his tenure, the endowment grew from less than $2 million to over $100 million.

During Maidique's tenure, the university added 22 new doctoral programs. Research expenditures grew from about $6 million to nearly $110 million as defined by the National Science Foundation. In 2000, FIU attained the highest ranking in the Carnegie Foundation classification system, that of "Doctoral/Research University-Extensive." FIU's faculty has engaged in research and holds far-reaching expertise in reducing morbidity and mortality from cancer, HIV/AIDS, substance abuse, diabetes and other diseases, and change the approaches to the delivery of health care by medical, public health, nursing and other healthcare professionals, hurricane mitigation, climate change, nano-technologies, forensic sciences, and the development of biomedical devices.

The arts also flourished while Maidique was at the helm, with the university acquiring The Wolfsonian-FIU Museum on Miami Beach and building the Patricia and Phillip Frost Art Museum on its main campus. In athletics, FIU made inroads in becoming a powerhouse athletic university during Maidique's time as president; he unilaterally changed the mascot from the Sunblazers to the Golden Panthers early in his tenure, and he championed the eventual establishment of an NCAA football program. Finally, the school earned membership into Phi Beta Kappa, the nation's oldest honor society.

Maidique was the second longest-serving research university president in the nation. Now President Emeritus, he currently serves as the Alvah H. Chapman, Jr., Eminent Scholar Chair in Leadership, and Professor of Management at FIU.

Rosenberg presidency

On November 14, 2008, Maidique announced that he would be stepping down and asked FIU's board of trustees to begin the search of a new president. He said he would remain president until a new one was found. On April 25, 2009, Mark B. Rosenberg was selected to become FIU's fifth president. He signed a five-year contract with the board of trustees. On August 29, 2009, Rosenberg became FIU's fifth president.

Having started as a two-year upper division university, FIU has grown into a much larger traditional university and serves international students. More than $600 million has been invested in campus construction, with the addition of new residence halls, the FIU Stadium, recreation center, student center, and Greek life mansions, as well as the fielding of the Division I-A Golden Panthers football team in 2002.

Since 1986, the university established its School of Architecture, College of Law and College of Medicine (named the Herbert Wertheim College of Medicine in 1999 after Herbert Wertheim donated $20 million to the college, which was matched by state funds and is the largest donation in the university's history), and acquired the historic Wolfsonian-FIU Museum in Miami Beach.

FIU now emphasizes research as a major component of its mission and is now classed as a "very high research activity" university under the Carnegie Classification of Institutions of Higher Education. Sponsored research funding (grants and contracts) from external sources for the year 2007–2008 totaled some $110 million.  The Florida International University School of Hospitality & Tourism Management collaborated with the Ministry of Education of the People's Republic of China to work on preparations for the 2008 Summer Olympics. FIU was the only university in the United States invited to do so.

In December 2013, it was announced Royal Caribbean was building a $20 million 130,000 sq. ft. training facility for its performers at the school. The facility opened in March 2015. The complex serves architecture, art, and hospitality students and includes lighting, set design, marketing, and other internship and training opportunities.

On October 2, 2014, it was announced that FIU would play host to the Miss Universe 2014 pageant on January 25, 2015. FIU also hosted a talk from then-U.S. President Barack Obama in February 2015.

Rosenberg suddenly resigned from the university effective January 21, 2022, citing deteriorating health conditions of his wife. Just a week later it was revealed that he stepped down because he had made aggressive advances to a younger female employee, "causing discomfort," and creating a hostile work environment. Rosenberg is currently a professor of political science and international relations at the Steven J. Green School of International and Public Affairs at FIU.

2018 Pedestrian bridge collapse 

On March 15, 2018, a newly constructed pedestrian bridge collapsed outside the university, resulting in six fatalities. On May 6, 2020, the Florida Department of Transportation announced plans to design and rebuild the bridge, with guidance from the National Transportation Safety Board and collaboration with FIU. The design stage is scheduled to begin in 2021 and last for two years, with a further two years estimated to construct the bridge.

Jessell Presidency
Rosenberg was succeeded by Kenneth A. Jessell as president, previously FIU's chief financial officer and senior vice president for finance and administration. Jessell was selected as FIU's sixth president on October 17, 2022 by FIU's Board of Trustees and was and was confirmed by the Florida Board of Governors on November 9, 2022.

See also

FIU Panthers
History of Florida
List of Florida International University people

Notes

References

External links
 Florida International University - Main Website
 History of Florida International University
 Florida International University Special Collections & University Archives
 State Archives of Florida

Florida International University
Florida International University